The National Film Award for Best Non-Feature Animated Film is one of the National Film Awards presented annually by the Directorate of Film Festivals, the organisation set up by Ministry of Information and Broadcasting, India. It is one of several awards presented for feature films and awarded with Golden Lotus (Swarna Kamal).

The award was instituted in 1967, at 15th National Film Awards and awarded annually for films produced in the year across the country, in all Indian languages.

Awards 

All the awardees are awarded with 'Rajat Kamal' (Silver Lotus Award) and cash prize. Award winners include Producer, Director and Animator of the film.

Cash prize amount varied over the period. Following table illustrates the cash prize amount over the years:

Following are the winners over the years:

References

External links 
 National Film Awards Archives
 Official Page for Directorate of Film Festivals, India

Animation Film Non-Feature
1967 establishments in India
Awards established in 1967